The Society for Phenomenology and Existential Philosophy (SPEP) is a philosophical society whose initial purpose was to promote the study of phenomenology and existentialism but has since expanded to a wide array of contemporary philosophical pursuits, including critical theory, feminist philosophy, poststructuralism, critical race theory, and increasingly non-Eurocentric philosophies. SPEP was created in 1962 by American philosophers who were interested in Continental philosophy and were dissatisfied with the analytic dominance of the American Philosophical Association.  It has since emerged as the second most important philosophical society in the United States. Gail Weiss and Alan Schrift are the current Co-Executive Directors of SPEP.

History

SPEP's first meeting was at Northwestern University in 1962, during which "a handful or two of phenomenologists, existentialists, and iconoclasts gathered."  Now with a membership of over 2,500, SPEP has grown to be one of the largest philosophical societies in North America.

As an acronym for Studies in Phenomenology and Existential Philosophy, "SPEP" also denotes a series of scholarly monographs and translations founded by James M. Edie and published by Northwestern University Press since the early 1960s, including works by Maurice Merleau-Ponty, Paul Ricoeur, and Edmund Husserl. The current series editor is Anthony Steinbock.

See also
World Phenomenology Institute
British Society for Phenomenology
Phenomenology (philosophy)
Existential phenomenology
Edmund Husserl
Edith Stein
Martin Heidegger
Maurice Merleau-Ponty
Jean-Paul Sartre
Paul Ricoeur
Emmanuel Levinas
Jacques Derrida

References

External links 
SPEP website
SPEP Series page

Phenomenology
Existentialist organizations
Philosophical societies in the United States
Organizations established in 1962
Continental philosophy organizations